The Ministry of National Defence is  a government ministry office of the Republic of Tunisia, responsible for coordinating and supervising all agencies and functions of the government concerned directly with national security and the Tunisian Armed Forces. The current minister is Imed Memmich since 2021.

List of ministers
This is a list of defence ministers of Tunisia.

1956–1957: Habib Bourguiba
1957–1966: Bahi Ladgham
1966–1968: Ahmed Mestiri
1968: Bahi Ladgham
1968–1969: Mohammed Mzali
1969–1970: Beji Caid Essebsi
1970–1971: Hassib Ben Ammar
1971–1972: Béchir M'hedhbi
1972–1974: Abdallah Farhat
1974–1976: Hédi Khefacha
1976–1979: Abdallah Farhat
1979–1980: Rachid Sfar
1980–1988: Slaheddine Baly
1988–1991: Abdallah Kallel
1991: Habib Boularès
1991–1996: Abdelaziz Ben Dhia
1996–1997: Abdallah Kallel
1997–1999: Habib Ben Yahia
1999–2001: Mohamed Jegham
2001–2004: Dali Jazi
2004–2005: Hédi M'henni
2005–2010: Kamel Morjane
2010–2011: Ridha Grira
2011–2013: Abdelkarim Zbidi
2013–2014: Rachid Sabbagh
2014–2015: Ghazi Jeribi
2015–2017: Farhat Horchani
2017–2019: Abdelkarim Zbidi
2019–2020: Mohamed Karim El Jamoussi (interim)
2020–2021: Imed Hazgui
2021: Brahim Bartagi
2021: Imed Memmich

External links
Official Website of the Tunisian Ministry of Defence

Defence
Defence
Politicians
Ministries established in 1957
1957 establishments in Tunisia
Tunisia